Parlatoreopsidina is a subtribe of armored scale insects.

Genera
Benaparlatoria Balachowsky, 1953
Genaparlatoria McGillivray, 1921, more often as a synonym for Parlatoria in Parlatoriina
Microparlatoria Takahashi, 1956
Paraparlagena Mamet, 1959
Parlagena McKenzie, 1945
Parlaspis McKenzie, 1945
Parlatoreopsis Lindinger, 1912
Sishanaspis Ferris, 1952

References

Parlatoriini